Yuri Alexandrovich "Yura" Borisov (also tr. Yuriy Aleksandrovich Borisov; born December 8, 1992) is a Russian actor. Winner of the Golden Eagle Award – 2021. GQ Russia chose him as Actor of the Year in 2020.

Early life
Borisov was born in Reutov, Moscow Oblast near Moscow. In 2013 he graduated from the Shchepkin Higher Theater School (course of Vladimir Mikhailovich Beilis and Vitaly Nikolayevich Ivanov), and won the Golden Leaf award in the Best Actor category for the role of Alexander Tarasovich Ametistov in the play Zoykina's Apartment

Acting career
Yura started working as a film actor in 2010, and played main roles in various television series. In 2013–14 he worked at the Moscow theater "Satyricon". 

In 2019, he starred in the film The Bull, for which he was nominated for the 18th Golden Eagle Awards 2020 in the category Best Leading Actor, and also received an award "Event of the Year" from the magazine "Kinoreporter" in the category "Discovery of the Year". He also played minor roles in the films T-34 (2019 film), Union of Salvation (2019 film), and Invasion (2020 film).

In February 2020, the film AK-47 was released, in which Yura Borisov played the main role – Mikhail Kalashnikov, and received positive reviews from film critics. For this role he was awarded the Golden Eagle Award – 2021.

2021 was a very busy year for Yura Borisov – he played in 8 feature films released in 2021. In 2021 Yura played the lead role in Finnish-Russian film Compartment No. 6 directed by Juho Kuosmanen, which won the Grand-Prix at the 2021 Cannes Film Festival.

Selected filmography

References

External links 
 Yuri Borisov on kino-teatr.ru

1992 births
Living people
People from Reutov
Male actors from Moscow
Russian male film actors
Russian male television actors
Russian male stage actors
21st-century Russian male actors